Chemokine (C-X-C motif) ligand 13 (CXCL13), also known as B lymphocyte chemoattractant (BLC) or  B cell-attracting chemokine 1 (BCA-1), is a protein ligand that in humans is encoded by the CXCL13 gene.

Function 

CXCL13 is a small chemokine belonging to the CXC chemokine family.  As its other names suggest, this chemokine is selectively chemotactic for B cells belonging to both the B-1 and B-2 subsets, and elicits its effects by interacting with chemokine receptor CXCR5.  CXCL13 and its receptor CXCR5 control the organization of B cells within follicles of lymphoid tissues and is expressed highly in the liver, spleen, lymph nodes, and gut of humans.  The gene for CXCL13 is located on human chromosome 4 in a cluster of other CXC chemokines.

In T lymphocytes, CXCL13 expression is thought to reflect a germinal center origin of the T cell, particularly a subset of T cells called follicular B helper T cells (or TFH cells). Hence, expression of CXCL13 in T-cell lymphomas, such as Angioimmunoblastic T-cell Lymphoma, is thought to reflect a germinal center origin of the neoplastic T-cells.

References

External links
 
 

Cytokines